Jean-Baptiste Eugénie Dumangin (or Du Mangin) (7 March 1744 - 28 March 1826) was a French physician known to have participated in the final treatment and autopsy of Louis XVII, the younger son of King Louis XVI and Queen Marie-Antoinette. His two favourite fields were therapeutics and hygiene.

Biography
He was born in Château-Thierry (Aisne), son of Jean Dumangin (1710-1769), directeur des Aides, and Jeanne Eugénie de La Haye de la Gonnière. He was received as a doctor in Paris on 15 September 1768 and made "acte de régence" on 17 September of the same year. In 1780, he was elected Professor of Pharmacy at the Faculty of Medicine and Doctor of the Hôpital de la Charité (renamed Hospice de l'Unité during the revolutionary period) in Paris. He worked there with Jean-Nicolas Corvisart (1755-1821), who became Napoleon's first physician and a member of the Académie Nationale de Médecine.

He was editor of the Journal de médecine, de chirurgie et de pharmacie from 1776.

Political life
On 21 April 1789, Dumangin was designated by the 367 citizens of the Assembly of the Third State of the district of Saint-Germain l'Auxerrois, to be one of the 405 Parisian voters to take part, from 12 to 18 May, in the election of the 20 deputies of the Third State representing the city of Paris at the Estates General of 1789.

On 18 May 1789, during the election of Abbé Sieyès, he wrote a protest against the election of a clergyman by the assembly of the Third State.

He was a member of the "Permanent Committee" set up on 13 July at the Town Hall to provide for the subsistence and organisation of the militia; then, three weeks later, he was a member of the "Provisional Committee for Police, Security and Tranquillity" of Paris. As a member of this committee, he signed a decree suspending the performances of Marie-Joseph Chénier's tragedy, Charles IX, or St. Bartholomew's day.

However, his political activity declined. In March 1790, he and Guillotin asked to be appointed doctors of the Parisian National Guard without any salary. He became a member of the Société des Amis de la Constitution and joined the Feuillants club on 18 July 1791. It represented the last and most vigorous attempt of the moderate constitutional monarchists to steer the course of the revolution away from the radical Jacobins.

The National Legislative Assembly (1 October 1791) did not include Dumangin in its ranks and he was sought during the Terror.

Buyer of Biens nationaux
On January 8, 1791, Dumangin acquired the "Château de Rubelles" in Saint-Prix, a village of 515 inhabitants north-west of Paris in the Montmorency valley. He had it demolished to keep only the "Château des Vendôme" acquired in the same lot. This property belonged to André Louis Sulpice d'Albert who died on 22 December 1788, former president of the "Cour des monnaies".

Dumangin bought other property by dispossessing the former lord of Saint-Prix, François Nicolas Le Bas du Plessis (1740-1819). On 13 September 1797, Demangin denounced Mme du Plessis, wife of this lord of Saint-Prix, as an emigrant and liable to deportation. On 9 November he took the lot and reunited the two hectares adjoining his residence with the ten hectares of the seigniory: the "château" and the park of Saint-Prix.

Care and autopsy of Louis XVII
On 28 July 1794, the representative of the people Paul Barras was charged by the Comité de Salut public to visit Louis XVII, last male prisoner of the Temple. The young prince had pains in his knees and ankles and was bloated.
On 26 February 1795, the commissioners noted the existence of tumours in all the joints.
On 6 May 1795, the Comité de Salut public sent Pierre-Joseph Desault, chief surgeon of the Hospice de l'Humanité (Hôtel-Dieu), to give him treatment. Desault visited him every day but died the next month. The rumour that his death was caused by poisoning during this summons was disproved by the autopsy carried out by his pupil, Xavier Bichat.
 
Philippe-Jean Pelletan, chief surgeon of the Hospice de perfectionnement de l'Hôtel-Dieu, succeeded Desault as of June 5; but, not wanting to take sole responsibility for the treatment, he asked that the Security Committee be willing to add Dumangin to his staff, which was granted. On June 7, Dumangin saw the patient for the first time and found that he was extremely weak, had swollen joints, all the symptoms of lymphatism with chronic diarrhoea.

The patient died the next day 8 June 1795 (20 prairial year III) probably from ulcero-caseous peritonitis of hematogenous origin during chronic disseminated tuberculosis. On 9 June, four members of the General Security Committee visited the corpse and noted the death. The act reads as follows:

As soon as the convention was informed of the death, it prescribed the addition of two doctors to Pelletan and Dumangin to perform the autopsy. Pierre Lassus and Nicolas Dieudonné Jeanroy were added to them. The autopsy report was written by Dumangin. He wrote:

Empire and Restoration
In 1801, Dumangin was one of the twenty-four members of the General Council of the Department of the Seine, which served as Paris City Council.

On 27 January 1809, at the age of 64, he married his third wife, Anne de Coste de la Calprenède, aged 21, a distant descendant of Gauthier de Costes, seigneur de la Calprenède.

A final episode opposed Pelletan and Dumangin after the Bourbon Restoration of 1815. Following a tradition of preserving royal hearts, Louis XVII's heart was removed and smuggled out during the autopsy by Pelletan. Thus, Louis' heart was not interred with the rest of the body. Pelletan stored the smuggled heart in distilled wine in order to preserve it. However, after 8 to 10 years the distilled wine had evaporated, and the heart was from that time kept dry.

In 1817, Pelletan attempted to give the Louis XVII's heart to his uncle, Louis XVIII, because the king had expressed his intention to show some gratitude to those who had shown sympathy for his family in times of trouble. But Pelletan did not mention his colleague Dumangin: the latter expressed his displeasure and a discussion arose between the two doctors. Anyway Louis XVIII refused the "gift" because he could not bring himself to believe that was the heart of his nephew. Pelletan then donated the heart to the Archbishop of Paris, Hyacinthe-Louis de Quélen.

After forty years of service in the hospital, Dumangin retired in 1820 at Saint-Prix, Val-d'Oise, near Montmorency, where he died on 28 March 1826 at the age of 82 without obtaining the Legion of Honour.

Notes

References

18th-century French physicians
People from Château-Thierry
1754 births
1826 deaths
19th-century French physicians